The International Association of Universities (IAU) is a membership-led non-governmental organization working in the field of higher education. It comprises more than 600 higher education institutions and organizations in over 130 countries. IAU is an official partner of UNESCO. The IAU secretariat is based in Paris and is located at the headquarters of UNESCO.

History
IAU was created under the auspices of UNESCO on 9 December 1950 during the International Conference of Universities in Nice. Its goal was and remains to encourage cooperation among institutions of higher education worldwide.

Governance
The governing bodies of the IAU are the General Assembly and the Administrative Board. The Secretariat implements the strategy adopted by the governing bodies.

Members
As of 1 January 2022, the International Association of Universities counts more than 600 members (institutions, organizations, affiliates and associates) in over 130 countries worldwide.

References

External links
 Website
 World Higher Education database
 International Bibliographic Database on Higher Education
 IAU Global Portal to promote Higher Education & Research for Sustainable Development 
 IAU Portal to promote Innovative Approaches to Doctoral Education in Africa

Education in Paris
International college and university associations and consortia
Organizations based in Paris
Organizations established in 1950
1950 establishments in France